PQ: Practical Intelligence Quotient, also known as simply PQ, is a puzzle game for the PlayStation Portable.

PQ is notable for being the first published game from D3 Publisher in North America.

A sequel to this game, PQ2: Practical Intelligence Quotient 2, was released in 2006-2007.

Gameplay
The game's framework is centered on discovering the player's "practical intelligence quotient," by completing a test consisting of 100 puzzles. The player controls a white, human-like avatar who can interact with the game world. The puzzles are all logic-based, and include a variety of tasks, from rearranging blocks to avoiding security guards to operating machinery. In most of the levels, an exit must be reached to complete that stage.

After clearing all 100 levels, the player's score is determined based on how long each stage took, among other variables. The player's PQ could be taken online and be compared with other players' scores (a high score table was also available online).

Reception

The game received "average" reviews according to the review aggregation website Metacritic. IGN called PQ a "deep, involving puzzle game". GameSpot noted that while the game has some "deliberate and challenging puzzles", one has to be "willing to look past an interface that is occasionally awkward".

References

External links
 Official PQ: Practical Intelligence Quotient page at PlayStation.com
 

2005 video games
D3 Publisher games
Now Production games
PlayStation Portable games
PlayStation Portable-only games
Puzzle video games
Video games developed in Japan
Single-player video games